A crumble is a dish that can be made in a sweet or savoury version. Crumbles became popular in Britain during World War II, when the topping was an economical alternative to pies due to shortages of pastry ingredients as the result of rationing.

In the UK, the term "crumble" refers to both a dessert similar to the American apple crisp, which is topped with rolled oats and brown sugar, or a dessert topped with a finer mixture of butter, flour, and brown sugar. In the US, the term only refers to the latter.

Care must be taken to balance the correct amount of crumble topping with the fruit, or else the filling may seep through and spoil this crust. Crumble is traditionally served with custard, but today it is sometimes served with cream or ice cream. Crumbles made from apples, and sometimes other fruits, are also common in Australia, New Zealand and Ireland.

See also

 Cobbler (food)
 Crisp
 Brown Betty
 Smulpaj, a similar Swedish dessert
 Streusel

References

External links

Crumble recipes
What is a crumble

Baked goods
Desserts
Fruit dishes
British desserts
Irish cuisine

sv:Paj#Smulpaj